Aguachica, is a small city and municipality in the southern region of the Cesar Department, Colombia. There is no historical support on the date of its foundation; however, August 16, 1748 has been chosen by the community.  Saint Roch (San Roque, in Spanish) is the patron saint of the municipality and August 16 is the date on which the Catholic Church celebrates its festival.

Geography

The municipality is located south of the Cesar Department, between the Cordillera Oriental Andean mountains and the Magdalena River. The municipality of Aguachica borders to the north with the municipality of La Gloria and the Department of North Santander (municipality of El Carmen); to the east with the municipality of Rio de Oro; to the south with Rio de Oro once again, with the municipality of San Martín and the Department of Santander (municipality of Puerto Wilches) and to the west with the municipality of Gamarra and the Department of Bolívar (municipality of Morales) covering a total area of 876 km2, 3.8% of the total area of the Department of Cesar.

The northern area of the municipality is mountainous part of the Cordillera Oriental mountain range with altitude varying between the 200 m and 2,150 m over sea level. The southern area of the municipality of Aguachica is predominantly flat with two major rivers flowing through the region; the Magdalena River and the Lebrija River.

History

Pre-Columbian

The territory of present-day Aguachica was inhabited by amerindian Chimila tribes, before the Spanish conquerors arrived. This tribe was later brutally decimated by the Spanish.

Spanish conquest and colonization

During the first decades of the 17th century, the area was established as the Hacienda de San Roque by the Spanish and was owned by Don Antonio Garia de Bonilla, but due to pests and illnesses the settlement was moved a few hundred meters to the south. By 1722 the settlement had grown in the middle of an hacienda predominantly owned by Don Casimiro Ramos de Barahona (also spelled Barahoja). The settlement was serving now as a rest area for merchants traveling to and from the nearby fluvial port town of Gamarra and Ocaña (present-day Department of North Santander).

On 1748, the settlement received the royal grant in favor of Jose Lazaro de Rivera and established as a Roman Catholic parish. By this time the Spanish conqueror Jose Fernando de Mier y Guerra was ordered to "pacify" the Chimila indigenous groups and to reorganize some villages in the basin of the Magdalena river. These foundations and re-foundations were approved back then by José Alfonso Pizarro viceroy of the Viceroyalty of New Granada between 1749 and 1753. In 1753 the Spanish ordered the construction of houses in Aguachica and was made part of the Government of Santa Marta.

Between 1798 and 1804 a plague swept most of the population causing the village to move to its present location. In 1914 became a municipality.

The Republic

By 1850 the first migrants arrived to Aguachica largely attracted by the plantations of coffee in neighboring Ocaña, Sovereign State of Santander and also introduced agricultural and farming practices for commerce in the region. During the 1920s, Petroleum deposits were found in the area triggering another wave of migrants mostly from the neighboring departments of Colombia; Antioquia, Caldas, Santander, North Santander and Boyaca.

During the 1950s the construction of the highway and the Magdalena railroad turned Aguachica into a strategic area between the Andean region and Caribbean region. The 1960s were marked by the migration of people from the Department of Tolima mostly farmers interested in exploiting the land, developing large plantations of cotton, sorghum, rice, among other products. The economy grew, developing an economy based on agricultural products, commerce and services.

Colombian armed conflict

During the 1980s and early 1990s the region was influenced by the Colombian armed conflict producing the displacement of people from the countryside and from neighboring regions of the southern Department of Bolívar and the Department of Cesar into the municipality seat.

Politics

Administrative divisions
The municipality of Aguachica is subdivided into Barrios, Corregimientos (9) and Veredas (64).

Corregimientos
Barranca de Lebrija, Buturama, Campo Amalia, El Juncal, Loma de Corredor, Norean, Puerto Patiño, Santa Lucía, Villa de San Andrés (El Totumal).

Veredas
Barcelona, Bombiadero, Cañada Ospina, Caracol, Costa Rica, El Corral, El Tope, Esmeralda Alta, Honduras, Cascabela, La Pajuila, La Ye, Las Bateas, Las Margaritas, Los Caliches, Los Llanos, Marinilla, Palmira, Peralonso, Soledad, Quebrada Seca, San Benito, San José, San Pablo, Santa Inés, Bella Vista, Campoalegre, Caño Caracolí, Cerro de los Bustos, El Carbón, El Faro, Esmeralda, Guaduas, La Bocatoma, Santo Domingo, La Unión, La Yegüerita, Las Latas, Las Piñas, Los Columpios, Maligüal, Palenquillo, Peñoncito, Planadas – Limoncito, Sabana de Caballeros, Puros Altos, San Francisco, San Lorenzo, San Pedro, La Ceiba, Cerro Bravo, La Morena, Las Adjuntas, Lucaicál, San Miguel, Santa Lucia, Villa Nueva, Boquerón, Cerro Redondo, La Campana, La Yegüera, Mucuras, Santa Bárbara, Santa Rosa.

Heritage Sites 
Aguachica has religious sites such as Cerro de la Cruz in which religious traditions are practiced and where the pilgrimage of parishioners from the municipality begins, in addition to the San Roque Parish, this building, built in the hacienda of the same name, is considered the starting point of the establishment of the church and history of Aguachica. In the book "Floresta de la Santa Iglesia Catedral de la Ciudad y Provincia de Santa Marta" by José Nicolás de la Rosa, which was written between 1736 and 1738, is one of the first records documenting the existence of the San Roque Parish. By 1748, Aguachica was officially assigned as a parish. Another religious temple in Aguachica is the Church of Maria Auxiliadora established by the Comboni Missionaries, who in 1992, entered Aguachica to accompany the population, in 2006, the structure of the church was completed and was handed over to the Diocese of Ocaña. Another heritage site is the Eladio Vargas Cultural Center, which is in charge of documenting and preserving the history, traditions, culture and folkloric aspects of Aguachica, which has been in existence for more than 18 years.

Nature Reserves 
Aguachica has a natural reserve of the Agüil Forest, which has 40 different species of butterflies and 88 types of birds. Currently the forest has 8 hectares in which there are 200 different species of plants. One of the main types of flowers found in the forest are Acalypha, Machaerium and Solanum.

Demographics

In the 2005 Census by the DANE the municipality of Aguachica had a total population of 80,789.

The majority of the population 51% is female while 49% are male. Of these 0.1% considered itself of indigenous ancestry and 3.7% of Afro-Colombian ancestry.

87% of these 80,789 people living in houses, while 2.1% lived in apartment buildings and 10% in rented rooms. 4.8% of these homes were also used for home businesses. 90% of the municipality of Aguachica had electricity, 73% with sewage service, 87% had aqueduct services, 50% had natural gas services installed at home while 30% percent had a telephone line.

References

External links

 Aguachica official website
 2005 Census: Aguachica
 Luis Angel Arango Library: Aguachica y algodón: historias paralelas

 
Municipalities of Cesar Department
Populated places established in 1748